North Marion School District is a public school district in Marion County,  Oregon, United States that serves the cities of Aurora,  Donald, and Hubbard and the communities of Broadacres and Butteville. There are  about 1983 students enrolled in the district's four schools, which are all located on a single campus in Aurora. The superintendent is Ginger Redlinger.

Demographics
In the 2009 school year, the district had 30 students classified as homeless by the Department of Education, or 1.6% of students in the district.

Schools

North Marion High School 

As of 2020, North Marion High School has an enrollment of 617 students.
The principal is DeAnn Jenness.

North Marion Middle School 
As of 2020, North Marion Middle School had an enrollment of 487 6th- to 8th-grade students. The Principal of Operations is David Sheldon.

North Marion Intermediate School
As of 2020, North Marion Intermediate School had an enrollment of  424 3rd- to 5th-grade students. The Principal is Cory Gaub.

North Marion Primary School
As of 2020, North Marion Primary School had an enrollment of 429 preschool to 2nd grade students.  The Principal is Alice Hunt.

References

External links
 

School districts in Oregon
Education in Marion County, Oregon